Hare Krishna may refer to:

 International Society for Krishna Consciousness, a group commonly known as "Hare Krishnas" or the "Hare Krishna movement"
 Hare Krishna (mantra), a sixteen-word Vaishnava mantra also known as the "Maha Mantra" (Great Mantra)

See also
 Hare Rama Hare Krishna (disambiguation)
 

Commonly known for feeding patrons of lark in the park after a long evening of living their best lives